The Consolidated Model 2 was a PT-1 biplane trainer diverted to the United States Navy for a trainer competition in 1925. It beat out 14 other designs, and was ordered into production as the NY-1.

Development
The NY-1 was essentially a PT-1 with provisions for the wheeled landing gear to be replaced by a single large float under the fuselage and two stabilising floats under the tips of the lower wing. A larger vertical tail was added to counter the effect of the floats.
The NY-2 had a longer span wing fitted to overcome the high wing-loading issue of the seaplane version.
The NY-3 aircraft were similar to the NY-2 but had  Wright R-760-94 engines.

Operational history
The NY-1's first flight was November 1925, with deliveries starting May 1926.
The NY-2s first flight was October 1926. The Navy had 108 in active use in 1929, with 35 more assigned to reserve squadrons.
The NY-3 was delivered in 1929. The NY series was being phased out in the mid-1930s, with 15 in service in 1937, and one in service in 1939.

Variants

NY-1 wingspan ,  Wright J-4 Whirlwind, 76 built.

NY-1A a number of NY-1 aircraft modified for gunnery training with one  trainable machine gun in the rear cockpit.

NY-1B a number of retrofitted NY-1 aircraft with the long-span wings of the NY-2 and the  Wright J-5 Whirlwind.

NY-2A NY-2 aircraft armed for gunnery training, 25 built.

NY-3 similar to the NY-2 with a  Wright R-760-94 Whirlwind, 20 built.

XN3Y-1 a single NY-2 tested with a Wright R-790-A Whirlwind.

Operators

Brazilian Naval Aviation

United States Navy
United States Marine Corps

Specifications (NY-2 floatplane)

See also

References

External links

Consolidated NY-1 (NASA) accessed July 16, 2007
Consolidated NY-2 (NASA) accessed July 16, 2007
Consolidated NY Trainer (US Centennial of Flight Commission) accessed July 16, 2007
Consolidated NY-1, -2, -3 (NAS GROSSE ILE) accessed July 16, 2007

NY
1920s United States military trainer aircraft